The Assistant Secretary of Defense for Nuclear, Chemical & Biological Defense Programs, or ASD(NCB), is the principal adviser to the Secretary of Defense, Deputy Secretary of Defense and the Under Secretary of Defense for Acquisition and Sustainment on policy and plans for nuclear, chemical, and biological defense programs. 

The Assistant Secretary of Defense for Nuclear, Chemical & Biological Defense Programs develops policies, advice, and recommendations on nuclear energy, nuclear weapons, and chemical and biological defense, including: 
 nuclear weapons; 
 chemical, biological, radiological, and nuclear (CBRN) medical and non-medical defense;
 safety and security of chemical and biological agents; 
safety, surety, security, and safe destruction of the current chemical weapon stockpile; 
 nuclear, chemical and biological arms control activities and related plans and programs. 

The Assistant Secretary of Defense for Nuclear, Chemical & Biological Defense Programs also serves as DoD coordinator and funding administrator for nuclear and conventional physical security equipment research, development, test, and evaluation programs executed by the Military Departments and the Defense Threat Reduction Agency (DTRA).

Before the National Defense Authorization Act for Fiscal Year 2011 on January 7, 2011, the Assistant Secretary of Defense for Nuclear, Chemical & Biological Defense Programs was known as the "Assistant to the Secretary of Defense for Nuclear & Chemical & Biological Defense Programs".

Three Deputy Assistant Secretaries of Defense report to the Assistant Secretary of Defense for Nuclear Chemical & Biological Defense Programs: 
 the Deputy Assistant Secretary of Defense for Chemical and Biological Defense (DASD(CBD))
 the Deputy Assistant Secretary for of Defense for Nuclear Matters (DASD(NM))
 the Deputy Assistant Secretary of Defense for Threat Reduction and Arms Control (DASD(TRAC)) 

In addition, the Director of the Defense Threat Reduction Agency reports directly to the Assistant Secretary of Defense for Nuclear, Chemical & Biological Defense Programs. 

The Deputy Assistant Secretary of Defense for Chemical and Biological Defense executes day-to-day management, governance, and resourcing of the Chemical and Biological Defense Program (CDBP) and coordinates with the Executive Agent (EA) for Chemical and Biological Defense (CBD) and other Office of Secretary of Defense components using the procedures and governance framework in DoDI 5160.01.  

The Deputy Assistant Secretary of Defense for Chemical and Biological Defense oversees development of Chemical, Biological, Radiological and Nuclear (CBRN) defenses to protect national interests at home and abroad, handling Department of Defense efforts related to: 
 science & technology,
 advanced development 
 test and evaluation of chemical, biological, radiological and nuclear defenses

 the Chemical and Biological Defense Program Objective Memorandum (POM).

The Deputy Assistant Secretary for Nuclear Matters is primarily the focal point for activities and initiatives related to sustaining a safe, secure, and effective nuclear deterrent and countering threats from nuclear terrorism and nuclear proliferation. This office serves as a primary point of contact for Congress, other agencies, and the public for those programs. 

The Deputy Assistant Secretary for Nuclear Matters (DASD(NM)) fulfills the nuclear weapons roles, responsibilities, and functions for the Assistant Secretary of Defense for Nuclear, Chemical and Biological Defense Programs (ASD(NCB)).  The Office of the Assistant Secretary of Defense for Nuclear, Chemical, and Biological Defense Programs/Nuclear Matters (OASD(NCB/NM)) is the focal point of the Department of Defense for the U.S. nuclear deterrent. In this capacity, Nuclear Matters is the primary DoD point of contact for Congress, the interagency, and the public and for allies and foreign partners on issues related to the U.S. nuclear stockpile and the integration and alignment of U.S. nuclear weapons and weapons systems. To perform these functions, Nuclear Matters is composed of representatives from all areas of the nuclear community, including the U.S. Navy, the U.S. Air Force, the National Guard Bureau, the United States Nuclear Command and Control Systems Support Staff, the Defense Threat Reduction Agency, the Department of Energy, the National Nuclear Security Agency, Los Alamos National Laboratory, Lawrence Livermore National Laboratory, Sandia National Laboratories, the Kansas City Plant, and the National Security Agency.

The Deputy Assistant Secretary of Defense for Threat Reduction and Arms Control is the principal adviser to the Assistant Secretary for Defense for Nuclear, Chemical & Biological Defense Programs for 
 acquisition oversight, implementation, and compliance with nuclear, biological, and chemical treaties; 
 cooperative threat reduction; chemical demilitarization programs; 

 building global partner capacity to counter weapons of mass destruction.  

The OASD(NCB/TRAC) exercises oversight of the Defense Threat Reduction and Agency-executed Cooperative Threat Reduction Program and provides oversight of the Chemical Demilitarization Program.  

This office also:
 oversees implementation of and compliance with existing and prospective nuclear, biological, and chemical arms control agreements in accordance with DoDD 2060.1;
 integrates programs to combat proliferation weapons of mass destruction; and 
 assists the Deputy Assistant Secretary of Defense for Nuclear, Chemical & Biological Defense Programs as Executive Secretary of the Counterproliferation Program Review Committee (CPRC) and Chair of the Standing Committee of the CPRC.

History 
The Office of the Assistant Secretary of Defense for Nuclear, Chemical & Biological Defense Programs' functions can be traced back to the US Department of Defense's Military Liaison Committee (MLC), formed in the early Cold War to coordinate military requirements with the United States Atomic Energy Commission. The MLC was the channel of communication between the DoD and AEC (and later, the US Energy Research and Development Administration and the US Department of Energy) on all matters relating to military applications of atomic weapons or atomic energy. It addressed matters of policy, programming, and funding of the military application of atomic energy. 

 In 1951, the Secretary of Defense moved the Military Liaison Committee to the Pentagon. Its chairman became the Deputy to the Secretary of Defense for Atomic Energy Matters. In 1953, this position was renamed the Assistant to the Secretary of Defense for Atomic Energy.

The National Defense Authorization Act for Fiscal Year 1987 (P.L. 99-661, passed in November 1986) abolished the Military Liaison Committee, replacing it with the Nuclear Weapons Council. Just over a year later, the National Defense Authorization Act for Fiscal Years 1988–1989 (P.L. 100-180) created the position of Assistant to the Secretary of Defense (Atomic Energy).

In 1994, the Assistant to the Secretary of Defense (Atomic Energy) was given control over the Defense Nuclear Agency (DNA), which became the Defense Threat Reduction Agency. In February 1996, the National Defense Authorization Act for Fiscal Year 1996 (P.L. 104-106) officially created the office of the Assistant to the Secretary of Defense for Nuclear & Chemical & Biological Defense Programs, or ASTD (NCB) to replace that of the Assistant to the Secretary of Defense (Atomic Energy).

The Clinton administration declined to nominate an Assistant to the Secretary of Defense for Nuclear & Chemical & Biological Defense Programs between 1997 and 2001, having determined (as part of its Defense Reform Initiative) that the position should be eliminated. Congress insisted that the Pentagon maintain the office, arguing it was necessary to ensure appropriate senior-level policy oversight and implementation guidance within the Department of Defense.

In January 2011, President Obama signed the National Defense Authorization Act for FY 2011, renaming the Assistant to the Secretary of Defense for Nuclear & Chemical & Biological Defense Programs the Assistant Secretary of Defense for Nuclear, Chemical & Biological Defense Programs.

Office Holders

The table below includes both the various titles of this post over time, as well as all the holders of those offices.

References